Anthony Joseph Burgess (29 July 1938 − 23 October 2013) was an Australian-born Papua New Guinean Roman Catholic bishop. Ordained to the priesthood in 1967 in Maitland for the Diocese of Hobart, Burgess was appointed coadjutor bishop of the Roman Catholic Diocese of Wewak, Papua New Guinea in May 2000, before being ordained bishop of the title in September 2000. He succeeded Raymond Kalisz in August 2002 and retired in September 2013, a month prior to his death.

References

1938 births
2013 deaths
Clergy from New South Wales
21st-century Roman Catholic bishops in Papua New Guinea
Roman Catholic bishops of Wewak